Marigul was a Japanese corporation created and jointly owned by video game company Nintendo Co., Ltd. (40%) and media company Recruit (60%). Its name is a combination of Nintendo's mascot Mario and Recruit's mascot Seegul.

Marigul was founded because the Nintendo 64 was not getting enough third-party support. Marigul would provide financing, to let game studios focus on making games. The only condition was that the studios would have a game ready in five years.

Studios
Marigul provided services for the video game studios Ambrella, Clever Trick, Noise, Param, and Saru Brunei. 
Although Marigul was liquidated in May 2003, Noise continues to make games, as did Ambrella until it was disbanded in 2020. Many games financed by Marigul have not been localized or released in North America.

Saru Brunei 

Saru Brunei was a Tokyo-based video game development company that worked in partnership with Nintendo between 1996 and 2003 as a part of Marigul Management. Saru Brunei was headed up by former Nintendo game designer Gento Matsumoto. Matsumoto was Shigeru Miyamoto's right-hand man for 15 years. Saru Brunei was made defunct as Marigul was liquidated in May 2003.

Saru Brunei was responsible for the cancelled Nintendo 64 game, Doubutsu Banchou (lit. Animal Leader), which was coded by Intelligent Systems. The studio then ported the game to the Nintendo GameCube as Cubivore: Survival of the Fittest in 2002. The game was published by Nintendo in Japan, but published by Atlus in North America. Other games include Jungle Park on PlayStation and Jungle Park: Saturn Jima on Sega Saturn.

Clever Trick
Clever Trick was a video game development company that worked in partnership with Nintendo. Clever Trick was a part of Marigul Management. Clever Trick was developing Echo Delta for the 64DD accessory, but Nintendo decided to cancel Echo Delta in 1999. Clever Trick was made defunct as Marigul was liquidated in May 2003.

References

External links

Source of Company Profile (IGN)
N-Sider's article containing info about Marigul Management, Inc.

Nintendo divisions and subsidiaries
Recruit (company)
Defunct video game companies of Japan
Video game companies established in 1996
Video game companies disestablished in 2003
Japanese companies established in 1996
Japanese companies disestablished in 2003